Jürgen Prochnow (born 10 June 1941) is a German-American actor. His international breakthrough was his portrayal of the good-hearted and sympathetic U-boat Captain "Der Alte" ("Old Man") in the 1981 war film Das Boot. 

He is also known for his roles in The Lost Honour of Katharina Blum (1975), Dune (1984), Beverly Hills Cop II (1987), In the Mouth of Madness (1994), The English Patient (1996), Air Force One (1997), The Da Vinci Code (2006), and played Sergei Bazhaev on the eighth season of 24 (2010). He is a Goldene Kamera, Bavarian Film Awards, and Bambi Award winner.

Early life
Prochnow was born in Berlin and brought up in Düsseldorf, the son of an engineer.

Career
Jürgen Prochnow portrayed Arnold Schwarzenegger in See Arnold Run, a 2005 film about the actor's political career in California. He played Commander Paul Gerald in Wing Commander (1999). He was the main antagonist in the Broken Lizard film, Beerfest (2006). 

Prochnow dubbed Sylvester Stallone's voice in the German version of Rocky (1976) and Rocky II (1979), as well as F.I.S.T and Paradise Alley (both 1978). He later acted alongside Stallone in the 1995 movie Judge Dredd. After the retirement of Stallone's long-time voice actor Thomas Danneberg, Prochnow assumed this job in 2018 with Creed II. He usually also dubs his own roles in English-language productions.

Prochnow and his older brother,  appeared in The Man Inside (1990), in which Jürgen played the leading role and Dieter a supporting role.

In 1996, he was a member of the jury at the 46th Berlin International Film Festival.

Personal life
In the early 1980s, Prochnow was in a relationship with Austrian actress , who fatally poisoned their 7-year-old daughter, Johanna, in 1987. In 1982, he married actor Jürgen Goslar's daughter, Isabel Goslar, with whom he has two children: a daughter, Mona, and a son, Roman. The couple divorced in 1997. Stein died in August 2018 in a motorcycle accident in Kanab, Utah. Since 2015, he has been married to actress Verena Wengler.

Prochnow used to divide his time between Los Angeles and Munich. He received U.S. citizenship in 2004. In 2017, he announced that he had sold his house in California and would be moving to Berlin.

Awards
 1985 Bavarian Film Awards: Best Actor

Filmography

 Zoff (1972), as Joky
 The Merchant of Four Seasons (1972), as Mann am Stammtisch / Man at the Meeting Table (uncredited)
 Tatort:  (1973, TV), as Dieter Brodschella
 The Tenderness of Wolves (1973), as Hehler
  (1974), as Franz Blum
 One or the Other of Us (1974), as Bernd Ziegenhals
 The Lost Honour of Katharina Blum (1975), as Ludwig Götten
 Die Konsequenz (1977, The Consequence), as Martin Kurath
  (1977), as Oss
 Tatort: Das Mädchen von gegenüber (1977, TV), as Klaus Linder
  (1980), as Alexander Späh
 Das Boot (1981, The Boat), as Kapitänleutnant - Der Alte
 War and Peace (1982), as Kevin
 Love Is Forever (1983, TV), as General Siegfried Kaplan
 The Keep (1983), as Captain Klaus Woermann
 Dune (1984), as Duke Leto Atreides
 Forbidden (1984), as Fritz Friedländer
  (1985), as The Cop
  (1986), as Ralph Korda
 Terminus (1987), as Sir / Doctor / Yellow Truck's Driver
  (Devil's Paradise) (1987), as Escher
 Beverly Hills Cop II (1987), as Maxwell Dent
 The Seventh Sign (1988), as David Bannon
 A Dry White Season (1989), as Captain Stolz
 The Fourth War (1990), as Col. Valachev
 Kill Cruise (1990), as The Skipper
 The Man Inside (1990), as Günter Wallraff
 The Schoolmaster (1990), as Rozinsky
 Robin Hood (1991), as Sir Miles Folcanet
 Hurricane Smith (1992), as Charlie Dowd
 Twin Peaks: Fire Walk with Me (1992), as Woodsman
 Interceptor (1992), as Phillips
 Jewels (1992, TV miniseries), as Joachim von Mannheim
 Body of Evidence (1993), as Doctor Alan Paley
 The Fire Next Time (1993, TV miniseries), as Larry Richter
  (1993), as Hans Strasser
 The Last Border (1993), as Duke
  (1993, TV series)
 Die Wildnis (1993), as Brenner
 Lie Down with Lions (1994, TV), as Marteau
 Trigger Fast (1994), as Jack Neumann
 Guns of Honor (1994, TV), as Jack Neumann
 Aventures dans le Grand Nord (1994, TV series), as Simon McQuarie
 In the Mouth of Madness (1994), as Sutter Cane
 Judge Dredd (1995), as Judge Griffin
  (1995, TV miniseries), as Alex Bronner
 Fesseln (1995, TV), as Guenther
  (1996, TV miniseries), as Kurdok
 On Dangerous Ground (1996, TV), as Carl Morgan
 The English Patient (1996), as Major Muller
 Privateer 2: The Darkening (1996, video game), as Xavier Shondi
 The Great War and the Shaping of the 20th Century (1996, TV series), as Kaiser Wilhelm II
  (1997, TV), as Holger
 DNA (1997), as Dr. Carl Wessinger
 Air Force One (1997), as General Ivan Radek
 The Replacement Killers (1998), as Michael Kogan
 The Human Bomb (1998, TV), as Gerhardt Dach
 China Dream (1998), as Paul Konen
 Schuldig (1998)
 The Fall (1999), as József Kovács
 Wing Commander (1999), as Cdr. Paul Gerald
 Esther (1999, TV), as Haman
 The Blond Baboon (1999, TV), as Jan Vleuten
 Heaven's Fire (1999, TV), as Quentin Darby
  (1999, TV), as Hans Hagemann
 Youri (1999)
  (2000), as Sacha Roublev
  (2000, TV), as Carl Krieger
 Padre Pio: Miracle Man (2000, TV), as Visitatore / The Inquisitor
 The Last Stop (2000), as Fritz
 Final Ascent (2000, TV), as Paul
 Jack the Dog (2001), as Klaus
 The Elite (2001), as Avi
 Last Run (2001), as Andrus Bukarin
 Ripper (2001), as Detective Kelso
 Dark Asylum (2001), as Dr. Fallon
 Heart of America (2002), as Harold Lewis
 Davon stirbt man nicht (2002, TV), as Everett Burns
 Checkpoint (2002)
 House of the Dead (2003), as Capitain Victor Kirk
 The Poet (2003), as Vashon
 Baltic Storm (2003), as Erik Westermark
 Julie, chevalier de Maupin (2004, TV), as Baron de Hengen
 See Arnold Run (2005, TV), as Arnold Schwarzenegger
  (2006)
 The Celestine Prophecy (2006), as Jensen
 The Da Vinci Code (2006), as Andre Vernet
 Beerfest (2006), as Baron Wolfgang von Wolfhausen
  (2006), as John Gregory
 Primeval (2007), as Jacob Krieg
 Nanking (2007), as John Rabe
 Ohne einander (2007, TV), as Ernest
 Ein Fall für zwei (2007, TV series), as KHK Max Gerber
 Dark Sector (2008, video game), as Yargo Mensik (voice)
 Hellboy: The Science of Evil (2008, video game), as Herman von Klempt (voice)
 La Conjura de El Escorial (2008), as Espinosa
 Merlin and the War of the Dragons (2008), as The Mage
 Oko (2009), as Mr. Hooked
 24 (2010, TV series), as Sergei Bazhaev
  (2010, TV), as Baron von Hahn
 Tatort:  (2010, TV), as Hans Rodenburg
 Sinners & Saints (2010), as Mr. Rhykin
  (2010, TV), as Fredo Kovacs
 NCIS: Los Angeles (2010–2014, TV series), as Mattias Draeger
  (2010, TV series), as Friedrich Otto Winterstein
 Die Schuld der Erben (2012), as Kurt Hanson
 Luck (2012, TV series), as Racetrack Owner
 Ein schmaler Grat (2013), as Uwe Wolfmann
 Company of Heroes (2013), as Luca Gruenewald
 Ohne Gnade! (2013), as Helmutchen
 Die Kinder meiner Tochter (2013), as Ernst Blessing
 Twin Peaks: The Missing Pieces (2014), as Woodsman
 Hitman: Agent 47 (2015), as Tobias
 Remember (2015), as Rudy Kurlander No. 4
  (2015), as Pius Ott
 Interference (2016), as Herr Ryser
 Tatort:  (2016, TV), as Kesting
  (2017), as Kern
 Leanders letzte Reise (2017), as Eduard Leander
 Damascus Cover (2017), as Franz Ludin
  (2017), as Dr. Schweikert
 Lore (2018, TV series), as Andreas Gruber
 A Hidden Life (2019), as Major Schlegel (uncredited)

Audiobooks (excerpt)
 2008: Frank Herbert: Dune: Der Wüstenplanet (together with Simon Jäger and Marianne Rosenberg), publisher: Lübbe Audio, 
 2013: Andreas Eschbach: Quantenmüll, publisher: Lübbe Audio (Audible) 
 2017: Andreas Eschbach: Eine unberührte Welt (together with Simon Jäger, Yara Blümel and Nicole Engeln), publisher: Lübbe Audio,

References

External links

 
 
Jürgen Prochnow at the German Dubbing Card Index

1941 births
Living people
American male film actors
American male television actors
Folkwang University of the Arts alumni
German emigrants to the United States
German male film actors
German male television actors
Male actors from Berlin
Male actors from Los Angeles
Male actors from Munich
People with acquired American citizenship
20th-century American male actors
20th-century German male actors
21st-century American male actors
21st-century German male actors